The Bratislava Zoo is a zoo in Bratislava, Slovakia. It is located in the area of Mlynská dolina in the borough Karlova Ves. Opened in 1960, it is the second oldest zoo in Slovakia. The zoo receives on average around 300,000 visitors annually. 

As of 2020, it is home to over 1150 specimens of 169 animal species and is open every day of the year, with the exception of 1 January. Major attractions include white lions, white tigers and DinoPark, featuring moving life-sized sculptures of dinosaurs. ZOO Bratislava was one of the first zoos in Europe that was successful in breeding Eurasian lynx in captivity.

Description
The Bratislava Zoo is an independent organization of the city of Bratislava. It focuses on the breeding and conservation of endangered animal species, scientific and research work, education of the public, and providing recreational facilities in the city. It offers educational programs for children and students and allows the public to symbolically adopt an animal from the zoo for a fee.

The zoo is located on a hilly and partially forested terrain on the slopes of the forested hills of Little Carpathians. The river Vydrica flows through the area. Despite a noise barrier the zoo struggles with noise pollution from the nearby D2 motorway.

Miloslava Šavelová was the zoo's managing director from 1991 to 2020. The managing director has since 2020 been Julia Hanuliakova.

Camels, donkeys and a Hamadryas baboon from the Bratislava Zoo starred in the 1997 movie Kull the Conqueror.

Notable exhibits:
 Breeding facility for South African lions, Tigers (white form), Jaguar and Sri Lankan leopards
 Primate House for Common chimpanzee and Sumatran orangutan
 Terrarium and exhibit of exotic species with Slender-tailed meerkats, tropical monkeys, sloths, armadillos, and two new fresh water Malawi and Tanganyika aquariums
 Enclosures of rhinoceroses and kangaroos
 Enclosures of zebras and giraffes
 Enclosures of antelopes and pygmy hippopotamuses
 Lakes in a natural style with flamingos and pelicans

History

A proposal to establish a zoo in Bratislava first appeared in 1948. The first intention was to build a zoo corner within the area of the Park of Culture and Relaxation on the Danube riverfront but later on, taking into consideration the importance of Bratislava as the capital of Slovakia, it was agreed to build a separate breeding and educational institution. At first, in 1949, it was considered to build a zoo in the area of Železná studnička, part of the Bratislava Forest Park. But the experts’ reports had confirmed this location as unsuitable.

Construction began in 1959 with the help of volunteers and students, and part of the zoo was officially opened on 9 May 1960. During the first decade of the existence of the zoo, there was already some achievement regarding breeding of macaques, baboons, porcupines, nutrias, leopards, pumas and dingos.

The zoo has undergone two major reductions, the first in 1981–1985, as a result of sewage system and motorway feeder construction, which reduced the area of the zoo to one-third, destroying two-thirds of the original exposition area and causing animal relocation within the zoo. As a consequence, a modern enclosure with the largest collection of exotic birds in Czechoslovakia had to be demolished and the birds were sent to other zoos. In 1991, a tiger escaped during the night and was shot within the zoo area. No person was harmed in the incident. In 2002-2003, the new enclosure for Turkmenian kulans, Bactrian camels and Shetland pony was constructed in the forested part of the zoo and the building of a breeding facility for Heptner's markhor and Barbary sheep had begun.

The second reduction was in 2003, when construction for the D2 motorway access road to the Sitina Tunnel forced a relocation of the entrance gate. Subsequently, the zoo had been closed to the public from December 2003, until the building of a new entrance, parking lot and noise barrier wall was finished. In 2004-2005, development plans of the ZOO Bratislava were accepted by the Bratislava municipal government and the construction of a new enclosure for big cats became one of the city priorities.

In 2004, an exhibition of Central European Mesosoic reptiles—DinoPark—was opened in the central area of the zoo, becoming a major attraction for ZOO Bratislava. At the area of almost  DinoPark features life-sized sculptures of dinosaurs that are animated during the summer season. It also features a 3D cinema, educational trails and a paleontological playground with fake fossils for children. Since 2006, the area also features a specimen of the rare plant Wollemia.

In 2006, the new big cats pavilion was opened to the public, housing  leopards, jaguars, tigers and lions. In 2007, development of the Primate House was started with the official opening in spring 2010. In the spring of 2008, the zoo shop and two playgrounds for children were constructed. Since 2009, ZOO Bratislava is allowed its own commercial business activities. In 2011, the zoo hit a record of 336,661 visitors during that year.

Collection

As of 2020 the Bratislava Zoo contains a collection of 169 animal species and approximately 1154 animals in total, including rare and endangered species such as white lions, white tigers, Sri Lankan leopards, caracals, jaguars, brown bears, eurasian wolves, red kangaroos, white rhinoceros, giraffes, zebra, Barbary macaques, red pandas, sumatran orangutans, chimpanzees and snowy owls.

Indoor enclosures feature numerous reptiles, birds and mammals such as ring-tailed lemurs, meerkats, golden-handed tamarins, silvery marmosets, dwarf crocodiles.

Association memberships
ZOO Bratislava is a member of the following zoo associations:

 Union of Czech and Slovak Zoological Gardens (UCSZOO) since 1990
 European Association of Zoos and Aquaria (EAZA) since 1994
 International Zoo Educators Association (IZE) since 2000  
 Species360 non-profit organization since 2001
 Euroasian Regional Association of Zoological Parks and Aquariums (EARAZA) since 2010

Notes

References
 About ZOO Bratislava on the Bratislava Guide page
 Briefly about ZOO Bratislava with photographs

External links

  

1960 establishments in Czechoslovakia
Zoo
Zoo
Zoo
Zoos established in 1960
Zoos in Slovakia